Whispers in Tahiti is a novel by F. J. Thwaites.

Plot
A young man who is told he only has a short time to live decides to leave England.

Background
Thwaites researched the novel on a boat trip from Australia to England with his wife.

Adaptations
A song inspired by the book was issued in 1947.

The novel was adapted for radio in 1948 and in 1953.

References

External links
Whispers in Tahiti at AustLit

1940 Australian novels